Nettlestead is a village and civil parish on the road south-west of, and part of the borough of Maidstone.  The parish includes Nettlestead Green and part of Seven Mile Lane.  More than 800 people live in the parish. The parish church of St Mary the Virgin has links with William the Conqueror's half brother, Odo.

According to the reference quoted below, 'it is said that Nettlestead church owes its enormous stained glass windows to a 15th-century Agincourt veteran who came back from France very impressed with what had already been done with stained glass decoration for churches there.

The man was Reginald de Pympe, and his son, John, added more stained glass later in the same century. The de Pympes made quite an impression upon Nettlestead in their day. Reginald moved into Nettlestead Place, which he rebuilt at about the same time as he had the church rebuilt and embellished with the new glass.

Nettlestead Green is a separate village lying two miles farther south. Both villages are close to the River Medway. Wateringbury is immediately to the north.

Notable residents
Reynold Pympe, MP

References

External links
notes on the village

Villages in Kent
Civil parishes in Kent